The Minnesota Association of Professional Employees (MAPE) is a Minnesota-based labor union representing professional employees serving the state of Minnesota. This bargaining unit includes employees who perform a wide array of specialized, professional services from accounting to zoology.  Within Minnesota, MAPE is the largest state bargaining unit with over 15,000 employees.

Origin of MAPE
In 1972 with the passage of the Public Employee Labor Relations Act (PELRA), state workers were given the right to join a union. Prior to 1972, the governor and the Minnesota Legislature controlled state employees' rights and benefits. With the passage of PELRA, state professional workers were initially represented by the international American Federation of State, County and Municipal Employees (AFSCME) - a union that currently represents many of the state's technicians, maintenance, and clerical workers.

As time passed, state professionals discovered that the workplace issues they faced were different than many of the  workers in AFSCME. Therefore, in 1980, these professionals voted to break away from this larger union to form their own independent union. This founding group of 4,500 grew to become the Minnesota Association of Professional Employees (MAPE), which now has over 11,850 members. As it does not have a national umbrella organization over it, MAPE is one of the largest independent unions in existence.

Structure of MAPE

In order to support a variety of worksites and employees located all over the state of Minnesota, MAPE has broken the state down into 21 separate regions.  Members of each region are served by electing their own slate of officers to represent them at the local level.

In order to make sure that the central organization is meeting the needs of all members in all regions, MAPE convenes a Delegate Assembly every Fall, typically in the first week or two of September.

As MAPE has grown and new members joined, the organization has naturally evolved. Since 1999 MAPE has worked hard to be a proactive, member-driven group. A new region/local structure was designed to promote grassroots activism.

Statewide Strike of 2001

Throughout the late 90s and into early 2000, Minnesota experienced a robust economy characterized by tax cuts and rebates. Things changed in 2001 after the “dot-com” bust and the events of September 11. Recessionary times gave way to grim financial forecasts amid rising health care costs. The struggle to maintain benefit and compensation levels for state workers finally came to a head. MAPE and AFSCME members refused to accept the high co-pays and out-of-pocket expense limits proposed by the state, and  so in September, 2001, members of the two biggest unions representing state workers voted overwhelmingly to strike. The Minnesota Association of Professional Employees announced that 84.2 percent of its members who voted rejected the state's final contract offer and authorized a strike, and earlier that day, leaders of the American Federation of State, County and Municipal Employees (AFSCME) Council 6 filed an official notice with the Bureau of Mediation Services and the state's Department of Employee Relations that more than 13,000, or 90 percent, of its voting members had approved a strike.

Negotiators for the unions and the state held a preliminary meeting at the Bureau of Mediation Services on Sept. 6. The Bureau conducted additional sessions from Sept. 12 to Sept. 16.

The major sticking point was wages. The state had offered a wage increase of about 2.5 percent per year but said that additional increases based on years of service could increase that to about 5 percent for many workers. The members were asking for increases of approximately 6 percent per year for the coming years.

Governor Jesse Ventura kept a low profile. But he did order special training exercises for the Minnesota National Guard in the event that he would order them to replace striking state workers.

Recent history

After a devastating 2003 round of negotiations resulting in wage freezes and insurance increases, the 2005 negotiations team had a resolute goal to ‘hold the line’ on insurance increases while negotiating a fair wage increase. Many MAPE members even felt this was unrealistic but nonetheless, MAPE achieved its goal by holding the line on insurance increases while managing an across the board increases for everyone.

MAPE Today

MAPE has built on coalition power over the last five years and has become a leader in the Minnesota labor community. Some of the coalitions MAPE works with on a regular basis are: Minnesota is Watching the Minnesota Fair Trade Coalition Twin Cities Labor & Religion Network Upper Midwest Labor/Management Coalition on Health Care, Broad Purchasing Alliance, Minnesota Universal Health Care Coalition Alliance for a Better Minnesota, and many others. MAPE also partners with other unions and non-profits and works towards building a better community for all.

The partial state government shutdown of July 2005 was an unprecedented fiasco which will live on in the minds of MAPE members and other state employees who were sent home for eight days that summer with no knowledge of when they would be allowed to return to work. The governor and legislature failed to pass a state budget by the constitutional deadline of midnight on June 30, 2005 and therefore had no authority to pay thousands of the state’s employees for work performed. The politicians further attempted to divide state employees by deeming some “essential,” and sending the rest home. The “make half” settlement allowed those workers sent home, through no fault of their own to receive half of the pay or vacation hours lost ten months after the fact.

Over the past five years, MAPE has expanded to include some school district, county and municipal government professional employees with separate bargaining agreements. These employees have sought out MAPE because they see the value and strength of having a union protecting their rights and benefits.

MAPE continues on its mission to protect and promote the interests of public employees. MAPE is committed to lobbying for its members to have all the resources they need to provide quality public services to the state’s citizens.

See also

Labor Unions in the United States
Labor Movement
List of U.S. Trade Unions
National Labor College
Organizing Institute
Union Summer
Change to Win Federation

External links
MAPE
AFL-CIO
Workday Minnesota

Trade unions in Minnesota

Trade unions established in 1980
Organizations based in Minnesota

State wide trade unions in the United States